Miodrag "Miško" Ražnatović (born September 16, 1966) is a Serbian lawyer and sports agent and former professional basketball player. He is the chairman, CEO, and founder of the BeoBasket agency and FIBA-certified agent. 

As one of the most respected and influential basketball agents in the entire industry, Ražnatović negotiated and completed some of the biggest deals in European basketball throughout the 2000s and 2010s.

Playing career 
Ražnatović played for Napredak Kruševac, FMP, Radnički Belgrade, Ulcinj.

Legal career 
Ražnatović earned his law degree from the University of Belgrade Faculty of Law in 1988. Four years later, he opened his own law firm and started his legal career.

Also, he represented Serbian football manager Radomir Antić in his 2009 contract negotiations with Football Association of Serbia (FSS).

Basketball agent career
Through his agency BeoBasket, Ražnatović mostly represents European basketball players and coaches as well as American players playing in Europe. He represents many of the highest-paid European basketball stars in EuroLeague. His notable clients include Nikola Jokić, Boban Marjanović, Dario Šarić, Ivica Zubac, Goga Bitadze, Vasilije Micić, Brandon Davies, Kyle Hines, Vladimir Lučić, Jan Vesely, Nemanja Bjelica, Marko Gudurić, Nemanja Nedović, Ante Žižić, Rodrigue Beabuois, Billy Baron, coach Ergin Ataman, coach Saša Obradović, coach Dejan Radonjić, coach Neven Spahija, coach Dejan Milojević, coach Vassilis Spanoulis, etc. Ražnatović was additionally involved in the Deron Williams' transfer to Beşiktaş during the 2011 NBA lockout. 

In the 2017–18 EuroLeague season, BeoBasket represented 35 players, and they were the first-ranked agency. In the 2018–19 EuroLeague season, BeoBasket represented 43 players, and they were the first-ranked agency. In the 2019–20 EuroLeague season, BeoBasket represented 42 players, and they were again the first-ranked agency. In the 2020–21 EuroLeague season, BeoBasket represented 46 players, and they were again the first-ranked agency. In the 2021–22 EuroLeague season, BeoBasket represented total 52 players which was the new record and again, they were the first-ranked agency. 

Ražnatović represented many former NBA players:

 Džanan Musa
 Mirza Teletović
 Ante Žižić 
 Jan Veselý 
 Joffrey Lauvergne
 Timothé Luwawu-Cabarrot
 Adam Mokoka
 Paul Zipser
 Vassilis Spanoulis
 Omar Cook
 Nikola Peković 
 Pero Antić
 Marko Gudurić
 Nemanja Nedović 
 Nenad Krstić
 Jared Cunningham
 Brandon Davies
 Darrun Hilliard 
 DeMarcus Nelson
 Khyri Thomas 
 Deron Williams

Ražnatović represents numerous active NBA players:

 Dario Šarić
 Ivica Zubac 
 Goga Bitadze
 Marko Simonović
 Juan Toscano-Anderson
 Nikola Jokić
 Nikola Jović
 Boban Marjanović
 Vlatko Čančar
 Cedi Osman

References

External links 

 Profile at hoopshype.com
 Profile at hoopsagents.com

1966 births
Living people
KK FMP (1991–2011) players
KK Napredak Kruševac players
KK Mega Basket
Sportspeople from Kruševac
BKK Radnički players
Serbian expatriate basketball people in Montenegro
20th-century Serbian lawyers
Serbian men's basketball players
Serbian sports agents
Serbian people of Montenegrin descent
University of Belgrade Faculty of Law alumni
Yugoslav men's basketball players
21st-century Serbian lawyers